Satratoxin-H, a trichothecene mycotoxin, is a naturally occurring toxin produced by the ascomycetes Stachybotrys chartarum  and Podostroma cornu-damae which is toxic to humans and animals. The clinical condition it causes is known as Stachybotrotoxicosis. It is related to the mycotoxin T-2, but unlike T-2 has not been reported to have been used as a chemical weapon.

Properties 

Satratoxin-H is almost completely insoluble in water, but is easily soluble in lower alcohols and polar solvents such as ethanol, methanol, 2-propanol, acetone and chloroform.

Satratoxin-H is not officially classified as a chemical weapon.

Effects 

Satratoxin-H is extremely versatile. Contact with the solution through ingestion, inhalation, or even prolonged physical contact produces symptoms similar to those listed below.

 a rash that becomes a moist dermatitis 
 nosebleeds 
 chest pain 
 pulmonary hemorrhage (bleeding in the lungs)
 Fever
 headache 
 fatigue

However, if consumed in large quantities, it can be lethal. Satratoxin-H has little effect on bare skin, and does not blister it in the way many chemical weapons do. However, upon contact with sensitive surfaces (eyes, interior of mouth or nose), inflammation will occur.

Otherwise it is reported to be about five times as toxic as T-2.

References 

 
 

Trichothecenes
Epoxides
Protein synthesis inhibitors